Exclusive Native (April 17, 1965 – May 10, 1983) was an American Thoroughbred racehorse who won the Sanford Stakes and Arlington Classic. He is best known as the sire of Triple Crown winner Affirmed, who helped Exclusive Native become the leading sire in North America of 1978 and 1979.

Background
Exclusive Native was a chestnut horse sired by Raise a Native out of Exclusive. Foaled in Florida, the chestnut colt was bred and owned by Louis Wolfson's Harbor View Farm.

Racing career
Exclusive Native won four races from thirteen starts, and his earnings totaled $169,013. Two of his wins included the Sanford Stakes in 1967 and the Arlington Classic in 1968. He was also second in the Saratoga Special, Arlington-Washington Futurity and Swaps Handicap, and third in the Hopeful Stakes.

Stud record
Notwithstanding his strong racing record, he is best remembered as the sire of two U.S. Racing Hall of Fame inductees: Affirmed and Genuine Risk. Affirmed won the American Triple Crown in 1978 and was Horse of the Year in both 1978 and 1979, helping Exclusive Native become the leading sire in North America for both those years. In 1980, Genuine Risk became one of only three fillies to ever win the Kentucky Derby. Exclusive Native sired many other stakes winners as well, including Champion 2-year-old filly Outstandingly and Champion 2-year-old colt Puerto RicoProdigo, as well as many Grade 1 Stakes winners like Mill Native, winner of the Arlington Million Stakes, Sabona, Life's Hope and Valdez. The 2015 U.S. Triple Crown winner, American Pharoah, has Exclusive Native as a member of his fourth generation.

Pedigree

References

 Exclusive Native's pedigree and partial racing stats

1965 racehorse births
1983 racehorse deaths
Racehorses bred in Florida
Racehorses trained in the United States
United States Champion Thoroughbred Sires
Thoroughbred family 10-a
Chefs-de-Race